Demons in the Spring is a collection of twenty short stories by Chicago author Joe Meno. Released by Punk Planet books in 2008, with illustrations by twenty artists  including Charles Burns, Archer Prewitt, Ivan Brunetti, Jay Ryan, Paul Hornschemeier, Anders Nilsen, Geoff McFedtridge, Kelsey Brookes, Kim Hiorthoy, Chris Uphues, Caroline Hwang, Rachell Sumpter, kozyndan, Evan Hecox, and Cody Hudson. Each of Meno's short stories explores depression, loneliness and insanity in the world. The characters are off-center and morose.

List of stories and contributing artists
 "Frances the Ghost" (illustration by Charles Burns)
 "Stockholm 1973" (illustration by Evan Hecox)
 "An Apple Could Make You Laugh" (illustration by Geoff McFetridge)
 "It Is Romance" (illustration by Ivan Brunetti)
 "The Sound before the End of the World" (illustration by Kim Hiorthøy)
 "Animals in the Zoo" (illustration by Jay Ryan)
 "People Are Becoming Clouds" (illustration by Nick Butcher)
 "Ghost Plane" (illustration by Jon Resh)
 "What a Schoolgirl You Are" (illustration by Kelsey Brookes)
 "Miniature Elephants Are Popular" (illustration by Todd Baxter)
 "The Boy Who Was a Chirping Oriole" (illustration by Archer Prewitt)
 "I Want the Quiet Moments of a Party Girl" (illustration by Caroline Hwang)
 "The Architecture of the Moon" (illustration by Souther Salazar)
 "The Unabomber and My Brother" (illustration by Cody Hudson)
 "Art School is Boring So" (illustration by Steph Davidson)
 "Oceanland" (illustration by Anders Nilsen)
 "Get Well, Seymour!" (illustration by Paul Hornshemeier)
 "Iceland Today" (illustration by Rachell Sumpter)
 "Airports of Light" (illustration by kozyndan)
 "Winter at the World-Famous Ice Hotel" (illustration by Laura Owens)

External links
 Amazon.com Synopsis and reviews

2000 short story collections
American short story collections
Short stories by Joe Meno